The 1937 National League Division One was the ninth season of the highest tier of motorcycle speedway in Great Britain.

Summary
The entrants were the same seven teams as the previous season.

West Ham Hammers won their first national title despite finishing bottom the previous season. In the process they stopped Belle Vue Aces from claiming a fifth consecutive title win. Belle Vue did however go on to win the cup double winning the Knockout Cup for the fifth successive year and the A.C.U Cup for the fourth successive year.

Roy Clarence Vigor (Reg Vigor) was fatally injured during a match at Wimbledon Stadium on 27 September. He hit a safety fence and his bike landed on top of him. He died in Nelson Hospital, Merton, three days later. His death came just one month after the death of Stan Hart in the 1937 Provincial Speedway League.

Final table

Top ten riders

National Trophy
The 1937 National Trophy was the seventh edition of the Knockout Cup.

Qualifying rounds
Southampton Saints won the Provincial final and therefore secured a place in the quarter finals.

Quarterfinals

Semifinals

Final

First leg

Second leg

Belle Vue were National Trophy Champions, winning on aggregate 115-110.

A.C.U Cup
The 1937 Auto-Cycle Union Cup was the fourth edition of the Cup and was won by Belle Vue for the fourth time. The groups were decided on the number of heat points scored within matches, rather than match wins.

First round
Group 1

Group 2

Final

See also
List of United Kingdom Speedway League Champions
Knockout Cup (speedway)

References

Speedway National League
1937 in speedway
1937 in British motorsport